Lengyel (literally: "Polish, Pole") is the highest inhabited village in Tolna County, Hungary. It is located between Bonyhád and Dombóvár. It was long held by the Apponyi family following its purchase by Count Antal György Apponyi in 1799.

Lengyel culture is named after the village.

Cultural events 
Annabál
Pollen Youth Rock Festival

Points of interest

Lengyel's Apponyi Castle was built by Count Antal György Apponyi's third son József in 18241829 and extensively remodeled from 1878 by Sándor Apponyi. It suffered fire damage in 1905. After Sándor's passing away, his widow Countess Alexandra Esterházy donated the castle in 1926 to the Hungarian National Museum but kept the privilege of living there until her death in 1930. During World War II it was used by Hungary's National Cartography Office, then became a Russian military hospital from January to March 1945, and later that year an internment camp for displaced Germans. After 1946 it became an agricultural school. It is surrounded by 22 hectares of park with botanical rarities.

The village church has a crypt of the Lengyel line of the Apponyi family, with the tombs of Rudolf Apponyi and his wife Anna (née von Benckendorff) and of Sándor Apponyi and his wife Alexandra (née Esterházy).

Other points of interest: 
 Kindergarten museum
 Svájceráj (a stable built in the Swiss fashion from the 19th century)
 The post office and kindergarten building (The first Apponyi manor house, which is smaller in size)
 Anna Bath - With 100 hectares of forested park, a school, a lake, and a small zoo.
 Sánci Peak (A historical area protected by Mór Wosinsky) with a beautiful panorama of the Kapos Valley.

People 
 Sándor Apponyi
 János Bogdán (hu) 
 József Cserháti (hu) 
 Mór Wosinsky (hu)

After approximately 200 years of residency, Lengyel's ethnic German Danube Swabian population was dispossessed of its property and forcibly removed to Germany following the end of World War II.

References

External links 
 Street map 
 Aerial Photography of Lengyel
 Pollen Rock Festival's Webpage
 Tolna County's ethnic German history and a few mentions of "Lengyel Castle"

Populated places in Tolna County
Hungarian German communities
Polish communities in Hungary
Apponyi family